The pygmy possums are a family of small possums that together form the marsupial family Burramyidae. The  five extant species of pygmy possum are grouped into two genera. Four of the species are endemic to Australia, with one species also co-occurring in Papua New Guinea and Indonesia.

They are nocturnal and omnivorous, living on a diet of invertebrates, fruit, seed, nectar and pollen. They are excellent climbers, due in part to their prehensile tails. Although they cannot glide like some possums, some species can leap long distances. They have a prehensile tail for grabbing branches, but spend most of their time on the ground.

Conservation International (CI) and the Indonesian Institute of Sciences (LIPI) reported the possible discovery of a new species of Cercartetus pygmy possum upon visit to the Foja Mountains in June 2007.

The mountain pygmy possum is the only mammal restricted to the alpine
and sub-alpine areas of mainland Australia. It was thought to be extinct until rediscovered in 1966 at Mt Higginbotham in Victoria. They are the only Australian marsupial that hibernates.  Given the alpine climates in which they live they store energy in fat deposits before rolling into a ball and engaging in heterothermy during winter months.

Classification
The two genera of pygmy possums are Burramys and Cercartetus. Burramys contains only one extant species, the mountain pygmy possum, B. parvus. As currently understood, Cercartetus consists of four extant species.

 Family Burramyidae: pygmy possums
 Genus Burramys
 Mountain pygmy possum, B. parvus
 †Burramys wakefieldi
 †Burramys triradiatus
 †Burramys brutyi
 Genus Cercartetus
 Long-tailed pygmy possum, C. caudatus
 Western pygmy possum, C. concinnus
 Tasmanian pygmy possum, C. lepidus
 Eastern pygmy possum, C. nanus

† = extinct species

References

External links
Mikko's Phylogeny Archive

Possums
Marsupials of Australia
Extant Pleistocene first appearances